1875 The Hartlepools by-election was fought on 29 July 1875.  The byelection was fought due to the resignation of the incumbent Liberal MP, Thomas Richardson.  It was won by the Liberal candidate Lowthian Bell.

References

1875 elections in the United Kingdom
1875 in England
19th century in County Durham
Politics of the Borough of Hartlepool
Hartlepool
July 1875 events